Herlocher Foods is the sole manufacturer of Herlocher's Dipping Mustard. The mustard was created by Charles C. Herlocher I from an old family recipe for the Train Station Restaurant in State College, Pennsylvania in the 1970s. Herlocher's Dipping Mustard became a coast-to-coast deli condiment staple in 1992, when Charles C. Herlocher II took over the nationwide distribution.

History 

In February 1978, at the Train Station Restaurant in State College, Pennsylvania, the mustard dip and pretzel combination was becoming popular with regulars. Customers throughout the Northeast sent checks requesting Herlocher's Dipping Mustard once it became available to "take-out".

Expansion began as popularity grew and Herlocher's Dipping Mustard became available throughout the east coast.

In 1997, Herlocher's Penn State Dipping Mustard was introduced and became a wildly popular tailgate item.

Products 

Herlocher's Dipping Mustard comes in several different labels and sizes packaged in glass jars: 8 oz regular labels and 14.5 oz NCAA Penn State and Ohio State labels.

References

External links 

Food and drink companies established in 1978
Food manufacturers of the United States
Manufacturing companies based in Pennsylvania
State College, Pennsylvania
Companies based in Centre County, Pennsylvania
American companies established in 1978
1978 establishments in Pennsylvania
Condiment companies of the United States